Nishimoto is a Japanese surname. Notable people with the surname include:

, Japanese actor
Joe M. Nishimoto (1919–1944), United States Army soldier and Medal of Honor recipient
, Japanese shogi player
, Japanese politician
, Japanese badminton player
, Brazilian-born Japanese photographer and internet celebrity
, Japanese footballer
, Japanese-Australian puppeteer
, Japaanese voice actress
Scott Nishimoto, American politician
, Japanese baseball player and coach
Takeshi Nishimoto (born 1974), Japanese guitarist and composer
, Japanese footballer
, Japanese volleyball player
, Japanese conductor
, Japanese weightlifter
, Japanese baseball player and manager

See also
Miku Nishimoto-Neubert, Japanese classical pianist
10193 Nishimoto, a main-belt asteroid
Nishimoto Trading Co., Ltd., a Japanese import/export company

Japanese-language surnames